British hockey team may refer to:

Great Britain men's national field hockey team
Great Britain women's national field hockey team
Great Britain men's national ice hockey team
Great Britain women's national ice hockey team